The 2020 Thomas & Uber Cup (officially known as the TotalEnergies BWF Thomas & Uber Cup Finals 2020 for sponsorship reasons) was the 31st edition of the Thomas Cup and the 28th edition of the Uber Cup, the biennial international badminton championship contested by the men and women's national teams of the member associations of Badminton World Federation (BWF). The tournament were played at Ceres Arena in Aarhus, Denmark. It is the first time that Denmark hosted the Thomas Cup and Uber Cup tournament and the first time this event was held in Europe since England 1982. It was due to be played on 15–23 August 2020, but on 29 April 2020 it was postponed to the 3–11 October due to the COVID-19 pandemic. On 15 September 2020 it was again postponed and on 21 December 2020 it was announced that it was postponed to 9–17 October 2021.

China was the defending men's champion team, and Japan was the defending women's champion team. Both were defeated in the final, by Indonesia and China respectively. Both Indonesia and China extended their record of 14 and 15 titles respectively.

Due to non-compliance with the new Anti-Doping rules by World Anti-Doping Agency (WADA), Indonesia (as Thomas Cup champions) and Thailand (as Uber Cup bronze medal) were not permitted to display their national flag at the Victory Ceremony. Instead, they replaced it with PBSI and BAT flag, respectively.

Host selection 
Aarhus was named as the host in November 2018 during BWF Council meeting in Kuala Lumpur, Malaysia, where BWF also decided the host for 18 major events, including Thomas and Uber Cup, Sudirman Cup, BWF World Championships, BWF World Junior Championships, and BWF World Senior Championships in 2019 through 2025.

Qualification

Thomas Cup 

 Note

Uber Cup 

 Note

Draw
The original draw for the tournament was conducted on 3 August 2020, at 15:00 MST, at BWF Headquarters in Kuala Lumpur. BWF then decided to redraw the tournament after the postponement from 2020 to 2021 this time to be conducted on 18 August 2021, at 15:00 MST also at the BWF headquarters in Kuala Lumpur. The 16 men and 16 women teams will be drawn into four groups of four.

For the Thomas Cup draw, the teams were allocated to three pots based on the World Team Rankings of 18 February 2021. Pot 1 contained the top seed Indonesia (which were assigned to position A1), the second seed Japan (which were assigned to position D1) and the next two best teams, China and Denmark. Pot 2 contained the next best four teams, and Pot 3 was for the ninth to sixteenth seeds.

A similar procedure will be applied for the Uber Cup draw, where top seed Japan (which were assigned to position A1), the second seed China (which were assigned to position D1), South Korea and Thailand were in Pot 1.

Thomas Cup

Uber Cup

Squads

Tiebreakers
The rankings of teams in each group were determined per BWF Statutes Section 5.1, Article 16.3: 
Number of matches won;
Match result between the teams in question;
Match difference in all group matches;
Game difference in all group matches;
Point difference in all group matches.

Thomas Cup

Group stage

Group A

Group B

Group C

Group D

Knockout stage

Bracket

Quarter-finals

Semi-finals

Final

Final ranking

Uber Cup

Group stage

Group A

Group B

Group C

Group D

Knockout stage

Bracket

Quarter-finals

Semi-finals

Final

Final ranking

Notes

References

External links 
Tournament Link
Official Website – Thomas & Uber Cup
Official Website – 2020 Thomas & Uber Cup

 
International sports competitions hosted by Denmark
Thomas
2021 in Danish sport
Badminton tournaments in Denmark
Thomas & Uber Cup
Thomas & Uber Cup
Thomas & Uber Cup